Colonel Kurush Bharucha-Reid or "KB" (29 March 1955 – 26 May 2010) gained prominence as an intelligence and special operations expert in the United States Army from 1973 to 2010 who garnered respect across the US Special Operations and United States Intelligence Community for his significant impacts on Defense HUMINT.

Kurush was of Indian and African-American descent and was born in Detroit, Michigan in 1955. Kurush provided major contributions to the US Army's Human Intelligence (HUMINT) programs and had considerable impacts on both training and combat missions around the world culminating with his achievement in receiving the Office of Strategic Service Society's Donovan Award, is a US Army Military Intelligence Hall of Fame inductee, along with numerous other combat decorations and medals. For similar reasons the Defense Intelligence Agency (DIA) established a new DIA training facility in Norfolk, VA dedicated as the Reid Center in his tribute to service and career impacts.

Biography
Kurush Bharucha-Reid was born to mathematicians Albert Turner Bharucha-Reid, of Hampton, Virginia and Rodabe Bharucha-Reid, a Parsi Zoroastrian from India. He graduated from Cranbrook Schools in 1973.

Bharucha-Reid, who was commonly known as KB, enlisted in the US Army's Special Forces in 1973. Kurush's skilled leadership and training support to foreign militaries in small-unit weapons and special operations tactics quickly resulted in his promotion to Sergeant First Class.

Then, in 1983, Kurush was selected to attend Officer Candidate School (OCS). He was then commissioned as a Second Lieutenant in the US Army's Military Intelligence career field after receiving his bachelor of science degree from the State University of New York in 1988.

A year later, in 1984, Kurush made a permanent change of station (PCS) to the Republic of Korea (ROK) where he served as the Chief of the Combined Liaison Team, 501st MI Brigade, US Army Intelligence and Security Command (INSCOM). Drawing from his earlier leadership experience, Kurush led a "one of a kind" special operations organization providing total immersion training to a small team of ROK personnel.  This unit was then capable of performing sensitive and high-risk intelligence collection operations in the event of a major military confrontation on the Korean Peninsula.

Three years later, in 1987, the now Captain Kurush was selected for membership in the US Army's Military Intelligence Excepted Career Program (MIECP), (otherwise known as GREAT SKILL). Upon entry into this lesser known element of the US Army, Kurush then served another 23 years in pursuance of some of the most challenging and sensitive assignments for the US Army's Military Intelligence function.

Assignments
 Regional Desk Officer and Special Assistant for Military Affairs for a national-level intelligence agency with focus on East Asian and Near East operations.
 Commander of a Defense Human Intelligence (HUMINT) Service base in Bosnia.
 Director Current Operations of a Tier 1 Special Mission Unit.
 Second Tour to Bosnia: CJ2 for Combined Joint Task Force Fervent Archer.

After those missions and assignments, in 2002, Kurush was tasked by the US Army to stand up and then command a sensitive HUMINT collection detachment under the Defense HUMINT Service. There he deployed to Afghanistan as a HUMINT case officer assigned to provide direct support to US Special Operations Command (USSCOM). Kurush then again deployed to Afghanistan in 2004 in the capacity of the Commander of a Defense HUMINT base where critical HUMINT activities were conducted during US surge operations in Afghanistan. These operations were in support of Afghanistan's first democratic elections after the fall to the Taliban and al-Qaeda.

In 2005, Kurush deployed to Iraq as a Senior HUMINT Advisor where he helped facilitate an inter-agency coordination cell. Upon completion of that assignment he later returned to serve as the Chief of the Military Group and Senior Department of Defense Instructor at a prestigious inter-agency intelligence training institution. Finally, in May 2009 Kurush assumed command of the US Army Field Support Center (AFSC).

Death and afterward
  During his last assignment at AFSC, Kurush was diagnosed and died as a result of pancreatic cancer.

He was then laid to rest in Arlington National Cemetery on 9 September 2010.

A year later in October 2011, the Defense Intelligence Agency's (DIA) Contingency Operation Base located in Kabul, Afghanistan was renamed to Camp K.B. Reid in honor of Kurush's service.  Additionally, in 2012, DIA established a new DIA training facility in Norfolk, VA dedicated as the Reid Center. These dedications were undertaken to illustrate the considerable impact Kurush had on the US Intelligence Community (IC) at large and the Defense HUMINT function.

Finally, in February 2014, the US Army's HUMINT Training Joint Center of Excellence (HT-JCOE) established an Honor Graduate Program in recognition of outstanding student performance in the Source Operations Course (SOC) and the Defense Advanced Tradecraft Course (DATC). Today, both uniformed service members and civilians are awarded the COL Kurush Bharucha-Reid Award for Excellence in HUMINT Tradecraft.

Honors, decorations, awards and distinctions
In addition to Kurush's career achievements his awards include:

The Defense Superior Service Medal, Bronze Star Medal with one Oak Leaf Cluster, Defense Meritorious Service Medal with three Oak Leaf Clusters, Meritorious Service Medal with three Oak Leaf Clusters, Joint Service Commendation Medal, Army Commendation Medal with one Oak Leaf Cluster, Army Achievement Medal, and the Ranger, Special Forces, Pathfinder, Master Parachutist, and Military Free Fall Jump Master badges.

In addition, Kurush received the Office of Strategic Service Society's Donovan Award and was inducted into the US Army's Military Intelligence Hall of Fame in 2014.

See also
Central Intelligence Agency
Defense Clandestine Service
Defense Intelligence Agency
Delta Force
Directorate of Operations (CIA)
Joint Special Operations Command
United States Army

References

1955 births
2010 deaths
Deaths from pancreatic cancer
Military personnel from Detroit
State University of New York alumni
United States Army colonels
American Zoroastrians
American people of Indian descent
American people of Parsi descent
Cranbrook Educational Community alumni